is a Japanese short-track speed-skater.

Shimizu competed at the 2014 Winter Olympics for the Japan. In the 1000 metres she was fourth in her heat, failing to advance, and placing 25th overall. As a member of the Japanese 3000 metre relay team, she finished third in the heat, and then second in the B Final, ending up 5th overall.

As of September 2014, Shimizu's best performance at the World Championships came in 2013, when she won a bronze medal as a member of the Japanese 3000m relay team. Her best individual finish was 18th, in the 2013 500m.

As of September 2014, Shimizu has eight ISU Short Track Speed Skating World Cup podium finishes, as part of the relay team, with the best a pair of silver medals. Her top World Cup ranking is 12th, in the 500 metres in 2012–13.

World Cup Podiums

References 

1989 births
Living people
Japanese female short track speed skaters
Olympic short track speed skaters of Japan
Short track speed skaters at the 2014 Winter Olympics
Short track speed skaters at the 2011 Asian Winter Games
World Short Track Speed Skating Championships medalists
People from Hamamatsu